Maurice Noël Floquet (25 December 1894 – 10 November 2006) was, at age 111 and 320 days, France's oldest man on record and was one of the last surviving French veterans of World War I. He is also France's longest-lived soldier of all time.

During the First World War
Floquet was in the artillery during World War I. His military history has been variously reported. It was said that he joined in September 1914 and served on the Belgian front in December 1914. He was wounded on several occasions. The first of these wounds came at the Second Battle of the Marne. A second occurred at the Somme during hand-to-hand fighting with bayonets. The third wound occurred at Beauséjour part of the Neuve Chapelle; a lump of rock pierced Floquet's throat and obstructed his breathing. By all accounts it was an enemy soldier who removed the rock and so saved Floquet's life.

A year later, and back on the front line, Floquet was again wounded in the head and left arm when a grenade exploded. The hole in Floquet's head was patched up by a nurse who found a piece of someone else's cartilage. Floquet's outer ear was blown off. After recuperating, toward the end of the war, Floquet was sent to a bomb factory, and was decommissioned in 1919. Floquet still had a German bullet lodged in his arm.

Later life
After the war, Floquet married and became a tractor repairman. He worked his garden until he was over age 100. At age 110 he still rode an exercise bike for 20 minutes a day in the backyard of his apartment — an unusual feat for a supercentenarian. However, by November 2006, Floquet was described as "confined to bed".

Floquet became France's oldest living veteran on 22 March 2002 when Hilaire-Francois Dharboulle died aged 109 years, 54 days, and later also the oldest living man in France upon the death of 111-year-old Polish-born Joseph Rabenda on 20 February 2003, and the oldest living European man upon the death of Jerzy Pajaczkowski-Dydynski on 6 December 2005.

On 24 March 2005, Floquet was promoted by president Jacques Chirac to the rank of officer in the Légion d'honneur.

In May 2006, Floquet became France's oldest verified man on record, when he surpassed Algerian-born Émile Fourcade (1884–1995), who lived to age 111 years and 153 days.

In October 2006, Floquet sent letters to Henry Allingham (then Britain's oldest man and oldest living veteran) and Robert Meier (Germany's oldest man and oldest living veteran at the time). The three shared the unique status of each being both the oldest man and oldest veteran of their respective countries. (France's then newly crowned oldest man, Aimé Avignon, who was born on 2 February 1897, thus making him almost 110 years old, did not serve in the war.)

Floquet died aged 111 years, 320 days on 10 November 2006, just one day before the 88th anniversary of the end of World War I. Upon his death, Henry Allingham became the oldest living European man.

References

1894 births
2006 deaths
French supercentenarians
French military personnel of World War I
Officiers of the Légion d'honneur
People from Haute-Marne